The 2019–20 Western Kentucky Hilltoppers men's basketball team represented Western Kentucky University during the 2019–20 NCAA Division I men's basketball season. The Hilltoppers were led by head coach Rick Stansbury in his fourth season and played their home games at E. A. Diddle Arena in Bowling Green, Kentucky as fifth-year members of Conference USA. They finished the season 20–10, 13–5 in C-USA play to finish in a tie for second place. They were set to be the No. 2 seed in the C-USA tournament. However, the C-USA Tournament was canceled amid the COVID-19 pandemic.

Previous season
The Hilltoppers finished the 2018–19 season with 20–14, 11–7 in C-USA play to finish in second place. They defeated North Texas and Southern Miss to advance to the championship game of the C-USA tournament where they lost to Old Dominion.

Roster

Schedule and results

|-
!colspan=9 style=| Exhibition

|-
!colspan=9 style=| Non-conference regular season

|-
!colspan=9 style=| C-USA regular season

|-
!colspan=12 style=| Conference USA Tournament

Source

References

Western Kentucky
Western Kentucky Hilltoppers basketball seasons
Western Kentucky Basketball, Men's
Western Kentucky Basketball, Men's